Klages's antwren (Myrmotherula klagesi) is a species of bird in the family Thamnophilidae. It is endemic to Brazil. It is named after the collector of the first specimen, Samuel M. Klages (1875-1957).

Its natural habitat is the canopy and edges of varzea forest. It is threatened by habitat loss and is listed by IUCN as Vulnerable.

References

Klages's antwren
Birds of the Brazilian Amazon
Endemic birds of Brazil
Klages's antwren
Klages's antwren
Taxonomy articles created by Polbot